The Canadian Hemophilia Society (CHS) is a non-profit organization founded in 1953 whose mission is to lead the fight against inherited bleeding disorders by helping people affected live healthy lives while searching for a cure. The organization consists of chapters in every province in Canada, and a national organization direction to the provincial chapters. It is named for the blood disease hemophilia.

See also
 World Federation of Hemophilia

References

Hematology organizations
Health charities in Canada
Haemophilia